The South African Railways Class 15CA 4-8-2 of 1926 was a steam locomotive.

In 1926, the South African Railways placed 23 Class 15CA steam locomotives with a 4-8-2 Mountain type wheel arrangement in service. Another 61 engines were ordered and delivered from three manufacturers in 1929 and 1930.

Class 15C redesign

After the twelve Class 15C Big Bill  Mountain type locomotives which were delivered by Baldwin Locomotive Works in 1925 had been in service a short while, it was discovered that the frames under the front of the firebox had a tendency to crack, necessitating heavy repairs.

To overcome this, a new modified design was prepared by Col F.R. Collins DSO, the Chief Mechanical Engineer (CME) of the South African Railways (SAR), for an almost identical locomotive but with the frames shortened to the front of the firebox and widened under the firebox by means of a bridle casting.

Manufacturers
The first batch of 23 of these redesigned locomotives were built for the SAR by the American Locomotive Company (ALCO). They were delivered in 1926, numbered in the range from 2039 to 2059, 2072 and 2073, and designated Class 15CA. The "A" supposedly indicated the manufacturer ALCO rather than, as was usual SAR practice, a different version of an existing locomotive type.

The earlier Baldwin-built Class 15C was then reclassified to Class 15CB for no good reason, since the "B" merely indicated the manufacturer Baldwin and not, as was usual practice, a branchline locomotive.

Another 61 Class 15CA locomotives were acquired in four batches from three other manufacturers in 1929 and 1930. Like the 23 ALCO-built locomotives, all except the last batch were built with  bore cylinders. 
 In 1929, four engines were delivered by Baldwin Locomotive Works in the United States of America, numbered in the range from 2074 to 2077.
 Also in 1929, ten locomotives were delivered by Società Italiana Ernesto Breda of Milan in Italy (now AnsaldoBreda), numbered in the range from 2801 to 2810.
 Also in 1929, 29 engines were built by the North British Locomotive Company (NBL) and delivered in that same year, numbered in the range from 2811 to 2839.
 The last 18 Class 15CA locomotives were also built by NBL in 1929. These were delivered in 1930 and numbered in the range from 2840 to 2857. This last batch of engines were built with larger  bore cylinders and larger diameter trailing wheels.

Characteristics
Apart from the redesigned frame under the firebox, these locomotives were very similar to the Class 15C in proportions and appearance. They also had Coale pop type safety valves, a Schmidt type superheater and a combustion chamber in the firebox, which was equipped with flexible side stays and water siphon arch tubes. Their coupled wheel axleboxes, crank pins and connecting rod big ends were grease lubricated.

Modifications

Retyring
This modification enabled these mixed traffic locomotives to handle the fastest mainline passenger trains.

When larger tyres were fitted to their coupled wheels, the old tyres were left in position and turned down on the wheel centres to serve as liners and the new tyres were then shrunk on over the liners. The leading coupled wheels, which had been flangeless as built, were flanged during the retyring. The practice of increasing the diameter of coupled wheels, wheel spacing and other considerations permitting, was begun by A.G. Watson during his term in office as CME and was continued by his successors. The reduction of tractive effort caused by the larger wheels was made up by increasing boiler pressure or by fitting larger cylinders or both, as required. This policy resulted in more mileage between heavy repairs, less cost-per-mile on repairs and locomotives capable of higher speeds.

Reboilering
During the early 1940s, three of the Class 15CB and Class 15CA locomotives were reboilered with new boilers numbered in the range from 9504 to 9506. These boilers were of similar dimensions as the originals but with a different tube arrangement. It was designed by Dr. M.M. Loubser, CME at the time. The reboilered locomotives were not reclassified.

Service

South African Railways

The Class 15CA locomotives were placed in service on the mainline between Cape Town and Kimberley but like the Class 15CB, they were later transferred to Bloemfontein. From here they worked throughout the Free State until they were eventually relocated to the Eastern Transvaal system. There they worked out of Pretoria to Pietersburg in the north and from there to Tzaneen in the east and Messina on the Rhodesian border in the north. Some also worked out of Witbank and Breyten.

In the early 1960s, a few joined the Class 15CB on the National North Coast line. Here they were used on, amongst others, the night and day passenger trains to and from Empangeni on the north coast line and on passenger trains to and from Kelso on the south coast line. In 1983, they all went from there to the Cape Northern system for use on the lines from Beaconsfield in Kimberley, working north to Mafeking and south to De Aar. Eventually nearly forty of them ended up as heavy shunters at Kaserne and Germiston in Johannesburg where they replaced the Class 12AR and Class S1.

15CA 2828 is now plinthed at the Gospel Express, Vinkrivier Station, R60, Robertson, is the Western Cape, South Africa. 2828 completes the 11 coaches stationed at Vink, as accommodation for the Gospel Express Christian Centre.

Industry
Three Class 15CA locomotives were sold into industrial service. Numbers 2807 and 2839 went to Dunn's Locomotive Works and were eventually sold to Rustenburg Platinum Mines. No. 2811 went to South Witbank Colliery as their no. 4.

Works numbers
The table lists the Class 15CA engine numbers, builders, years built and the builders' works numbers. The colour coding following the engine numbers refers to the three axle loadings of the different batches of the Class 15CA, as shown in the table of specifications.

Preservation

Illustration
The main picture shows Breda-built no. 2802, serving as school guard at Esselen Park, the Transnet School of Rail in Kaalfontein, Gauteng, on 21 September 2009.

References

External links

1850
1850
4-8-2 locomotives
2D1 locomotives
ALCO locomotives
Baldwin locomotives
Breda locomotives
NBL locomotives
Cape gauge railway locomotives
Railway locomotives introduced in 1926
1926 in South Africa